The Edison and Ford Winter Estates contain a historical museum and 21 acre (8.5 ha) botanical garden on the adjacent sites of the winter homes of Thomas Edison and Henry Ford beside the Caloosahatchee River in Southwestern Florida. It is located at 2350 McGregor Boulevard, Fort Myers, Florida.

On April 18, 2012, the American Institute of Architects' Florida Chapter placed the Edison and Ford Winter Estates  on its list of Florida Architecture: 100 Years. 100 Places.
The American Chemical Society recognized the Edison Botanical Research Laboratory at the Edison & Ford Winter Estates as a National Historic Chemical Landmark on May 25, 2014.

History 
The present site dates from 1885, when Edison first visited Southwest Florida and purchased the property to build a vacation home. He had traveled down to St. Augustine, Florida during the winter of 1885 at the behest of his doctor, who thought that the warmer climate would help cure an illness that Edison was suffering from. After recuperating in St. Augustine, he ended up traveling first across the state to Cedar Key, and from Cedar Key to Fort Myers.  His home, completed in 1886 and later dubbed "Seminole Lodge", served as a winter retreat and place of relaxation until Edison's death in 1931. Edison's good friend, Henry Ford, purchased the adjoining property, "The Mangoes" from Robert Smith of New York in 1916.  Ford's craftsman style bungalow was built in 1911 by Smith. In 1947, Mrs. Mina Edison deeded the Edison property to the City of Fort Myers in memory of her husband for the enjoyment of the public. It was opened for public tours soon after.

In 1988, the adjacent Henry Ford winter estate was purchased and opened for public tours in 1990. In 2003, the governance of the site was transferred from the City to a new non-profit corporation, Thomas Edison & Henry Ford Winter Estates, Inc. (dba Edison & Ford Winter Estates, Inc.) whose mission is to protect, preserve and interpret the site. The new corporation completed a $14 million restoration project in the following years. A separate fundraising arm, Edison-Ford Winter Estates Foundation, Inc. was created to assist the restoration project with no function in governance.

Gardens 

Edison's botanical garden contains more than a thousand varieties of plants from around the world, including African Sausage Trees and a  banyan tree planted in the mid-1920s.
The gardens feature plants grown for industrial purposes (such as bamboo, used in light bulb filaments) and those which Mina Edison planted for their beauty, including roses, orchids and bromeliads. The Moonlight Garden was designed by Ellen Biddle Shipman.

Before Hurricane Irma the collection included: Acalypha hispida, Arenga pinnata, Artocarpus heterophyllus, Billbergia spp., Blighia sapida, Bougainvillea glabra, Bougainvillea spectabilis, Calliandra haematocephala, Cananga odorata, Cattleya hybrid, Cattleya spp., Chorisia speciosa, Citrus spp., Clerodendrum speciosissimum, Cordyline terminalis, Cycad spp., Dendrobium, Dombeya spp., Epidendrum ciliare, Ficus auriculata, Ficus benghalensis, Ficus saussureana, Hibiscus schizopetalus, Holmskioldia sanguinea, Ibosa riparia, Ixora chinensis, Kigelia africana, Leea coccinea, Malvaviscus arboreus, Musa spp., Parmentiera cereifera, Plumbago auriculata, Solandra nitida, Spathoglottis plicata, Tabernaemontana corymbosa, Tecoma stans, Thunbergia erecta,  Pleroma semidecandrum (syn. Tibouchina semidecandra), and hundreds more.

Rubber laboratory 

During the period of 1914–1918 (World War I), Edison became concerned with America's reliance on foreign supplies of rubber. He partnered with Harvey Firestone and Henry Ford to try to find a rubber tree or plant that could grow quickly in the United States and provide a domestic supply of rubber. In 1927, the three men contributed $25,000 each and created the Edison Botanic Research Corporation in an attempt to find a solution to this problem. In 1928, the Edison Botanic Research Corporation laboratory was constructed. It was in Fort Myers, Florida that Edison would do the majority of his research and planting of his exotic plants and trees.

After testing over 17,000 plant samples, Edison eventually discovered a source in one of the species of flowering goldenrod, Solidago leavenworthii. Thomas Edison died in 1931 and the rubber project was transferred to the United States Department of Agriculture five years later.

Visitors 

There are also a variety of programs, tours and activities.

Edison Ford also offers school and education tours for all ages, an extensive summer camp program, science and engineering class for homeschool students,  emerging inventors programs for children ages 18 months – 5 years as well as travel and offsite tour opportunities. Other specialty programs include holiday nights, antique car shows, garden talks and a variety of special events throughout the year. The site can be reserved for events, weddings, corporate functions, meetings and group tours.

Edison Ford Winter Estates is a National Register Historic Site and received the Award of Excellence for restoration from both the National Trust for Historic Preservation and the National Garden Clubs, Inc. The site is a Florida Historic Landmark and has been designated as a National Historical Chemical Landmark by the American Chemical Society, the first site in the state of Florida to receive this honor.

The Edison and Ford Winter Estates research library and archival materials are also available for viewing by appointment. The research library contains over a thousand books on Fort Myers history and botany, as well as biographies on Thomas Edison and Henry Ford and their families.

Open to the public since 1947, Edison Ford Winter Estates receives more than 200,000 visitors annually. Designated as an educational and charitable not-for-profit organization, Edison Ford is governed by a board of trustees, professional staff and a large volunteer group.

Gallery

See also

The Henry Ford
List of Botanical Gardens in the United States
List of historic houses in Florida
List of museums in Florida

References

Bibliography

External links 

 Edison and Ford Winter Estates
 Lee County listings at National Register of Historic Places
 Florida's Office of Cultural and Historical Programs
 Lee County listings
 Lee County markers
 Great Floridians of Fort Myers

Historic house museums in Florida
Botanical gardens in Florida
Museums in Lee County, Florida
Science museums in Florida
Buildings and structures in Fort Myers, Florida
Houses in Lee County, Florida
Houses on the National Register of Historic Places in Florida
National Register of Historic Places in Lee County, Florida
Henry Ford
Tourist attractions in Fort Myers, Florida
American Craftsman architecture in Florida
Victorian architecture in Florida
Thomas Edison
1886 establishments in Florida